Renée Coleman (born January 8, 1962) is a Canadian actress who has appeared in several TV shows and movies.

Acting

TV
She is best known for her role in the NBC TV series Quantum Leap, in which she played the role of Alia, the "evil leaper." 
She was the star of the Diagnosis: Murder episode Call me Incontestable, Season 2, episode #15, Jan 20, 1995, where she played a member of a dating service, under suspicion for murder.

Films
Coleman is also known for her role in the 1992 box office hit A League of Their Own as left-fielder and substitute catcher Alice Gaspers, and in Who's Harry Crumb?, as kidnapping-victim Jennifer Downing.

Coleman starred and appeared in films from the late 1980s through the mid-1990s, including After School as September (1988, one of her early starring roles), Pentathlon (one of her last domestic roles), the Mexican film El Jardín del Edén (1994), the Polish film Gracze (1995), and the Swiss film Waiting for Michelangelo (1995).

Mythological Studies 
In 1995, Coleman left the film business and returned to school, where she earned her Ph.D. in Mythological Studies (with an emphasis on Depth Psychology) at Pacifica Graduate Institute in 2002. She currently lives with her husband and their four children in Santa Clarita, California, where she works in a private practice as a certified DreamTender. In August 2012, Coleman's first book, Icons of a Dreaming Heart – The Art and Practice of Dream-Centered Living, was published.

Filmography

References

External links
 
 GoodReads, Author of Icons of a Dreaming Heart

1962 births
20th-century Canadian actresses
Actresses from Saskatoon
Canadian film actresses
Canadian television actresses
Living people